The Nyindrou language is a West Manus language spoken by approximately 4200 people in the westernmost part of Manus Island, Manus Province of Papua New Guinea. It has SVO word order.

Phonology
Phoneme inventory of the Nyindrou language:

References

External links 
 Kaipuleohone's Robert Blust collections include written and audio recording materials of Nyindrou

Manus languages
Subject–verb–object languages
Languages of Manus Province